Sonova Holding AG (Phonak Holding AG before 1 August 2007) is an internationally active Swiss group of companies headquartered in Stäfa that specializes in hearing care (hearing instruments, cochlear implants, wireless communication). The Sonova group operates through its core business brands Phonak, Unitron, Hansaton, Advanced Bionics, AudioNova and Sennheiser. It is one of the largest providers in the sector worldwide. The group and its brands hold 24% of the global hearing aid market in sales. As of 11 September 2022, Sonova is a component of the Swiss Market Index.

History
The group traces its roots back to the Zurich-based AG für Elektroakustik, which was founded in 1947 with the participation of Ernst Rihs who acquired a majority shareholding in 1965, renaming the company Phonak AG in 1977. His two sons, Hans-Ueli and Andy Rihs, also went on to join the firm, along with Beda Diethelm; after Ernst Rihs' death, the two sons took over his shares while Beda Diethelm became a shareholder with equal rights.

Phonak Holding AG was founded in 1985 as a holding company for the Phonak Group. The company was floated on the SWX Swiss Exchange in 1994 and renamed Sonova Holding AG on 1 August 2007, although this change applied only to the holding company and in parts to the subsidiaries; the product names have remained unaffected.

Company
Sonova mainly develops and markets hearing aids, cochlear implants, and wireless communication devices compatible with their hearing devices.

The group consists of more than 30 constituent companies. Its research facilities are located in Switzerland, Canada, and the US, with manufacturing plants in Switzerland, China and Vietnam. Distribution is handled by its in-house wholesale network and independent sales partners. The group also owns retail outlets in selected countries.

In November 2009, Sonova announced the takeover of the Advanced Bionics Corporation, a company based in California which specializes in developing and manufacturing cochlear implants. The purchase was successfully completed in January 2010.

In March 2015, Sonova announced the takeover of Hansaton Akustik GmbH, a Hamburg-based, family-run wholesale hearing instrument company. The purchase was successfully completed in April 2015.

In May 2016, Sonova announced an agreement to acquire AudioNova International B.V., one of Europe's largest hearing aid retailers, and successfully completed the acquisition of AudioNova in September 2016. The combination of AudioNova and Sonova creates one of the broadest hearing aid retail service networks in Europe.

Brands
Sonova operates through its following core business brands:

Phonak
Phonak manufactures a wide range of digital hearing aids and integrated wireless communication systems. After the merger of Advanced Bionics into Sonova, Phonak started developing wireless technology for Advanced Bionics cochlear implants; notably the Roger receivers that connect to cochlear implant speech processors. In 2016, Phonak launched their first rechargeable hearing aid device.

Unitron
Unitron is a hearing aid manufacturer founded in 1964 in Newfoundland, Canada. Today, it operates in more than 70 countries and is headquartered in Kitchener, Ontario, Canada.

Advanced Bionics
Advanced Bionics was founded in 1993 and has been a subsidiary of the Sonova group since 2009. Advanced Bionics develops cochlear implant technology designed to help children and adults with profound hearing loss receive greater access to sound.

Upon the acquisition by Sonova, Advanced Bionics started integrating Phonak technology into their speech processors, starting with the Naída series. Along with sound processors, the company utilizes Phonak technology for bluetooth streaming, Easycall, and FM systems.

As of 2016, Advanced Bionics' primary competitors were MED-EL and Cochlear Limited in the cochlear implant market, in which those two companies held around 67% of the market; as percent of the market share Advanced Bionics (20%) holds less than Cochlear Limited and more than MED-EL (17%). In 2022 Advanced Bionics lost 5% of the market to Cochlear Limited and Med-EL due to implant recalls.

In 2020, the company released the world's first cochlear implant sound processor specifically for children. The Sky CI M uses Phonak's Marvel platform and has Phonak Roger technology built in.

Implant recalls

HiRes90k injuries 
In November 2010, Advanced Bionics recalled a batch of its HiRes 90K implants after many recipients, including children experienced painful malfunctions that caused electric shocks, convulsing, and vomiting. In Sadler v. Advanced Bionics, the company was found to have been negligent and was forced to pay punitive damages as well as for the medical care needed by the victim of the faulty device, but the company announced it would appeal on the grounds of the punitive damages being too high. Years before patients had experienced such drastic device failures, the company had been repeatedly warned of problems with the HiRes90k since 2004. Over 4000 devices were recalled, of which 1000 had failed.

Ultra 3D quality issue
In March 2020, Advanced bionics recalled a batch of its Ultra 3D implants due to poor performance.

Sennheiser 

Sennheiser Consumer Business is a consumer electronics manufacturer specializing in audio. Sennheiser had announced that they are looking to sell their consumer business to a willing buyer to focus on the Professional business. It was announced on 7 May 2021 that Sonova will be acquiring the business for an undisclosed amount. The acquisition has been completed in early 2022. The brand has become part of Sonova's Consumer Hearing department. It is estimated that about 600 employees have been involved in the transition.

References 

Medical technology companies of Switzerland
Hearing aid manufacturers
Companies based in the canton of Zürich
Companies listed on the SIX Swiss Exchange
Multinational companies headquartered in Switzerland
Swiss brands
Stäfa